Emil Grünig (26 July 1915 – 25 October 1994) was a Swiss sport shooter. He won a gold medal in Men's 300 m Rifle, 3 positions at the 1948 Summer Olympics in London.

References

External links

1915 births
1994 deaths
Swiss male sport shooters
Shooters at the 1948 Summer Olympics
Olympic shooters of Switzerland
Olympic gold medalists for Switzerland
Olympic medalists in shooting
Medalists at the 1948 Summer Olympics
People from Frutigen-Niedersimmental District
Sportspeople from the canton of Bern